White's skink (Liopholis whitii), also known commonly as White's rock skink, is a species of lizard in the family Scincidae. The species is endemic to Australia.

Etymology
The specific name, whitii, is in honour of Irish surgeon and naturalist John White.

Geographic range
L. whitii is widespread in south-eastern Australia, including Tasmania and many Bass Strait islands.

Habitat
White's skinks prefer a habitat with rocks, shrubby heathland and minimal human environmental disturbance. They also dig tunnels underground and have two entrances to the tunnel if needing an escape route. They also have well covered and hidden entrances to avoid predators.

Description
They are mature at ~ (SVL) in both sexes. tTis size is typically achieved at three years,  but may be earlier in captivity.

Whites' skinks are omnivorous, capable of eating meat, insects and plant matter. They will also occasionally eat strawberries and raspberries.

They are variable in colour and pattern. Some populations display no back pattern and/or lip stripes. Their base colours found on the central stripe range from grey to brown and red. 

The sides of their body is patterned with black and white rosettes backgrounded with a grey/brown gradient. Their underbelly is a pale peachy orange which increases in colour intensity towards the tail and on the underside of the limbs.

Their back is patterned with three bars, the middle being solid brown, and parallel on either side two black bars with white spots towered in a single sequence that terminates at the base of the head and tail. Their head and tail are typically brown with no patterning and minimal scale outlining present.

Most specimens have black stripes on both sides of their lips that run from their yellow-lined eye, down to a random speckling on the bottom of the chin. All individuals have varying lip patterns, and some do not have any at all.

Taxonomy
E. whitii is highly variable and may be a complex of closely related species

Behaviour
L. whitii are a burrowing polygynous (1 male per group of females) species, often digging or reusing complex tunnels. They live in small, sometimes temporary familial groups, with up to five females per male. However, the females do sometimes mate with males outside the group.

They are a highly aggressive species that will viciously attack other individuals that they do not recognize or 'like' via scent. This includes outside females that the group could potentially include, making them very difficult to pair. Adults also will sometimes cannibalize rival juveniles they do not recognize, and this includes tails.

Reproduction
L. whitii are viviparous and give birth to live young. Females will mate in September–October and give birth in late January–February over a period of two to ten days. Litter size ranges from 1–4.

Offspring are highly aggressive from the start and will fight amongst themselves to chase away their rival neonates from the group. Juveniles will stay within the protection their family/parent until they reach about half the size of an adult. At this stage, the adult will chase the juvenile out of the group by attacking it on sight.

Subspecies
Two subspecies are recognized as being valid, including the nominotypical subspecies.
Egernia whitii moniligera 
Egernia whitii whitii 

Nota bene: A trinomial authority in parentheses indicates that the subspecies was originally described in a genus other than Egernia.

References

Further reading
Boulenger GA (1887). Catalogue of the Lizards in the British Museum (Natural History). Second Edition. Volume III ... Scincidae ... London: Trustees of the British Museum (Natural History). (Taylor and Francis, printers). xii + 575 pp. + Plates I-XL. (Egernia whitii, pp. 135–136).
Cogger HG (2014). Reptiles and Amphibians of Australia, Seventh Edition. Clayton, Victoria, Australia: CSIRO Publishing. xxx + 1,033 pp. .
Lacépède (1804). "Mémoire sur plusieurs animaux de la Nouvelle-Hollande dont la description n'a pas encore été publiée ". Annales du Muséum National d'Histoire Naturelle, Paris 4: 184–211. (Scincus whitii, new species, p. 209). (in French).
Wilson S, Swan G (2013). A Complete Guide to Reptiles of Australia, Fourth Edition. Sydney: New Holland Publishers. 522 pp. . (Liopholis whitii, p. 332).

Reptiles described in 1804
Skinks of Australia
Liopholis